This is a list of settlements in the Trikala regional unit, Greece.

 Achladea
 Achladochori
 Agia Kyriaki
 Agia Paraskevi
 Agiofyllo
 Agios Nikolaos
 Agios Prokopios
 Agios Vissarion
 Agnantia
 Agrelia
 Aidona
 Amaranto
 Ampelochori
 Anthousa
 Ardani
 Armatoliko
 Asprokklisia
 Athamania
 Avra
 Chaliki
 Chrysavgi
 Chrysomilia
 Dendrochori
 Desi
 Dialekto
 Diasello
 Diava
 Dipotamos
 Drosero
 Drosochori
 Elati
 Eleftherochori
 Ellinokastro
 Faneromeni
 Farkadona
 Fiki
 Filyra
 Flampouresi
 Fotada
 Foteino
 Gardiki
 Gavros
 Genesi
 Georganades
 Gerakari
 Glinos
 Glykomilia
 Gomfoi
 Gorgogyri
 Grizano
 Kakoplevri
 Kalampaka
 Kalliroi
 Kallithea
 Kalogiroi
 Kalogriani
 Kalomoira
 Kastania
 Kastraki
 Katafyto
 Kato Elati
 Kefalovryso
 Keramidi
 Kleino
 Klokotos
 Koniskos
 Korydallos
 Koryfi
 Kotroni
 Koumaria
 Krania
 Krini
 Krinitsa
 Krya Vrysi
 Liopraso
 Livadochori
 Longa
 Longos
 Lygaria
 Malakasi
 Matoneri
 Mavreli 
 Mega Kefalovryso
 Megala Kalyvia
 Megali Kerasea
 Megalochori
 Megarchi
 Mesochora
 Moschofyto
 Mouria
 Myrofyllo
 Nea Pefki
 Neraida
 Neraidochori
 Nomi
 Oichalia
 Orthovouni
 Oxyneia
 Pachtouri
 Palaiochori
 Palaiokarya
 Palaiomonastiri
 Palaiopyrgos
 Panagia
 Panagitsa
 Paramero
 Parapotamos
 Patoulia
 Pefki
 Peristera
 Pertouli
 Petrochori
 Petroporos
 Petroto
 Pialeia
 Pigi
 Pineias
 Platanos
 Polyneri
 Polythea
 Prinos
 Prodromos
 Pyli
 Pyrra
 Raxa
 Rizoma
 Ropoto
 Sarakina
 Servota
 Skepari
 Spathades
 Stefani
 
 Taxiarches
 Theopetra
 Trikala
 Trygona
 Valkano
 Valtino
 Vasiliki 
 Vathyrrevma
 Vrontero
 Xyloparoiko
 Zarko
 Zilefti

By municipality

See also
List of towns and villages in Greece

 
Trikala